Papilio sosia, the medium green-banded swallowtail, is a butterfly of the family Papilionidae. It is found in the Afrotropical realm. The species was first described by Walter Rothschild in 1903.

Description
Forewing above in cellules 1 b—8 with distinct, small, usually double submarginal dots, but beneath without large submarginal spots; the median band formed almost as in nireus, though the spot in cellule 2 covers the base of the cellule, but is more produced anally than the spot in 1 c, which does not reach the cell. — Sierra Leone to the Congo region and Uganda. The median band is straight and regular and never less than 1 cm in cell lb of the forewing, nearly always much wider.

Biology
The larva feeds on Zanthoxylum and Citrus.

Subspecies
Subspecies include:
P. s. sosia (Guinea, Sierra Leone, Liberia, Ivory Coast, Ghana, Togo, Benin, southern Nigeria, western Cameroon)
P. s. pulchra Berger, 1950 (Cameroon, Gabon, Congo, Central African Republic, northern Angola, Congo Republic)
P. s. debilis Storace, 1951  (Uganda, northwestern Tanzania)

Taxonomy
Papilio sosia belongs to a clade called the nireus species group with 15 members. The pattern is black with green or blue bands and spots and the butterflies, although called swallowtails, they lack tails with the exception of Papilio charopus and Papilio hornimani. The clade members are:

Papilio aristophontes Oberthür, 1897
Papilio nireus Linnaeus, 1758
Papilio charopus Westwood, 1843
Papilio chitondensis de Sousa & Fernandes, 1966
Papilio chrapkowskii Suffert, 1904
Papilio chrapkowskoides Storace, 1952
Papilio desmondi van Someren, 1939
Papilio hornimani Distant, 1879
Papilio interjectana Vane-Wright, 1995
Papilio manlius Fabricius, 1798
Papilio microps Storace, 1951
Papilio sosia Rothschild & Jordan, 1903
Papilio thuraui Karsch, 1900
Papilio ufipa Carcasson, 1961
Papilio wilsoni Rothschild, 1926

See also
Congolian forests
Guinean Forests of West Africa

References

Sources
Carcasson, R.H. (1960). "The Swallowtail Butterflies of East Africa (Lepidoptera, Papilionidae)". Journal of the East Africa Natural History Society pdf Key to East Africa members of the species group, diagnostic and other notes and figures. (Permission to host granted by The East Africa Natural History Society)

Larsen, T.B. (2005). Butterflies of West Africa Apollo Books 
Storace, L. (1951-1952). Recherches sur le groupe africain de Papilio nireus L. Lambillionea 51:44-52; 54-57; 73-76.

External links

Butterfly Corner Images from Naturhistorisches Museum Wien

sosia
Butterflies described in 1903
Butterflies of Africa
Taxa named by Karl Jordan